Erodium malacoides is a species of flowering plant in the geranium family known by the common names Mediterranean stork's bill, soft stork's-bill and oval heron's bill. This is an annual or biennial herb which is native to much of Eurasia and North Africa but can be found on most continents where it is an introduced species.

Description
The young plant grows a number of ruffled green leaves radially outward flat against the ground from a knobby central stem. The stem may eventually reach half a meter in height with more leaves on long, hairy petioles. It bears small flowers with fuzzy, soft spine-tipped sepals and five lavender to magenta petals. The fruit is green with a glandular body about half a centimeter long and a long, pointed style two to three centimeters in length.

References

External links 
Photo gallery

malacoides
Flora of Malta